Bernheimer is a German surname. Notable people with the surname include:

Alan Bernheimer (born 1948), American poet
Alan W. Bernheimer (1913–2006), American professor of microbiology
Charles S. Bernheimer (1868–1960), American social worker
Kate Bernheimer, American writer
Konrad Bernheimer (born 1950), German art dealer and collector
Lehmann Bernheimer (1841–1918), German antique dealer
Martin Bernheimer (born 1936), American music critic
Otto Bernheimer (1877–1960), German art collector and antique dealer

See also
Bernheimer, Missouri, an unincorporated community in Warren County, Missouri, United States

German-language surnames